Edenhurst may refer to

Places
Edenhurst, Ontario, Canada

Ships
 a British cargo ship in service 1930-37